Gua Musang (Jawi: ڬوا موسڠ; Chinese: 话望生, Kelantanese: Guo Musae) is a town, district and parliamentary constituency in southern Kelantan, Malaysia. It is the largest district in Kelantan. Gua Musang is administered by the Gua Musang District Council. Gua Musang district is bordered by the state of Pahang to the south, Terengganu to the east, Perak to the west and the Kelantanese districts of Kuala Krai and Jeli to the north. It is a small railway town about 140 km south of state capital Kota Bharu. Gua Musang is represented by Tengku Razaleigh Hamzah in the Dewan Rakyat. The town lies on the KTM East Coast Line, from Tumpat, near the border with Thailand, to Gemas, Negeri Sembilan.

The Lojing Autonomous Sub-District (Jajahan Kecil Lojing) is in the western part of Gua Musang constituency.

Geography
Gua Musang literally means "Civet Cat Cave".  On the eastern side of this town stands Bukit Gua Musang, a barren hill of rocks and deceptive stone-steps running 105 metres high. It stands in a commanding position, with a huge cave running into its interior and is about metres away from the other green tree-covered hills. From a distance, this hill looks like a stone pillar with a big crack which nearly splits it vertically into two equal halves. Between the hill and the town, there runs a railway track.

Town area
Bandar Lama Gua Musang
Bandar Baru Gua Musang
Bandar Utama Gua Musang
Gugusan Chiku
Gugusan Aring
Gugusan Paloh
Taman Saujana Harmoni

History
Before 1986, Gua Musang District was known as Ulu Kelantan (Upper Kelantan) district, as it contains smaller rivers that will later converge to form the Kelantan River. Until 1977 Ulu Kelantan also contained Kuala Krai, Dabong and Kuala Balah in Jeli.

Transport

Car
Two federal routes, 8 and 185 intersect near Gua Musang. Route 8 leads to the state administrative centre of Kota Bharu northwards; while route 185 connects Simpang Pulai near Ipoh in Perak and Cameron Highlands in northwestern Pahang in the west to Kuala Jenderis and Kuala Terengganu in Hulu Terengganu in Terengganu in the east.

Public transport
Gua Musang railway station is served by the KTM Intercity Eastern Sector which runs between Tumpat (also in Kelantan) and Johor Bahru, Johor.

Demographics

Gua Musang as of 2010, has a population of 90,057 people.

Ranking Population Jajahan Gua Musang.

76% of the population is ethnic Kelantanese Malays, 13% are Orang Asli (Jahai, Temiar, Mendriq and Batek), 5% Malaysian Chinese, 5% non-Malaysians and 1% Malaysian Indian.

Federal Parliament and State Assembly Seats 

List of LMS district representatives in the Federal Parliament (Dewan Rakyat)

List of LMS district representatives in the State Legislative Assembly of Kelantan

Folklore

It was believed that long ago this town was inhabited by some superstitious hunters who made offerings of animals in front of the cave of Bukit Gua Musang. One afternoon a raging storm broke out and the huts of the hunters were destroyed. At the height of the storm a bolt of lightning struck the summit of the hill and nearly split it in two. The hunters, believing that the God of the Cave was angry with them, knelt down and began to pray. As they were praying they saw a huge pack of Civet Cats (or Musang in Malay) running into the cave. At once, they seized their bows and arrows and lay in wait for the foxes. They waited the whole evening but the foxes did not emerge, not even when the storm had stopped. From then on, the inhabitants called the cave Gua Musang.

A month after this strange event, seven young hunters climbed the hill but only one came back alive. He told the villagers that when he and his six companions were halfway up the hill, a length of stone staircase appeared before them. They climbed the staircase and upon reaching the summit they found a tree, under which, stood a bowl of pure water. The young men, with the exception of one, drank the water in the bowl to quench their thirst. Before the others could persuade him to drink, the bowl vanished. They grew afraid and quickly began to descend. Suddenly a blood-chilling cry was heard. The hunter turned quickly but it was too late! His six friends had disappeared from sight. He rushed down the slope but there was no sign of any dead bodies at the bottom of the hill.

He concluded that the "God of the Cave" had taken his friends and had spared him because he had not drunk the water in the bowl. Most of the villagers did not believe the young man's story. They were sure that the other six must have slipped and fallen, but the bodies of the missing hunters were never found.

Places of interest

Gua Musang is close to the northern gateway to Taman Negara (National Park), which is at Sungai Relau near Merapoh in Pahang. The small village of Merapoh is just south of Gua Musang and serves as a popular starting point for those who want to scale Gunung Tahan. The untouched tropical rainforest in Taman Negara is among the oldest in the world. It is well known for its biodiversity and is home to many endangered species of animals and plants.

Gua Musang is surrounded by limestone hills and caves, which have become popular with cavers and rock climbers.

Another interesting place to visit in Gua Musang is a Buddhist temple in Pulai, which is purportedly 400 years old.

Nenggiri River is a favourite among those who enjoy river rafting. There is also a rafting race, called Nenggiri Challenge. Archaeological sites can be found in caves, such as Gua Cha, Chawan and Jaya, which are situated along the river.

Gua Musang is the original home of the Musang King (Mao Shan Wang) cultivar of the durian, which is extremely popular through Malaysia and Singapore and is known as the "King of Durians".

The newest interest places in Gua Musang are Masjid Buluh Gua Musang; a mosque made up from bamboo, and new-built Masjid Razaleigh (as known as Al-Haram Al-Ghari, Arabic: الحرم الغاري); a new mosque resembling the Grand Mosque of Mecca . Both of them are located in Old Town (Bandar Lama) of Gua Musang.

Education

Primary School in Gua Musang District

 Sekolah Kebangsaan Tohoi
 Sekolah Kebangsaan Tengku Muhammad Fakhry Petra
 Sekolah Kebangsaan Sungai Terah
 Sekolah Kebangsaan Star
 Sekolah Kebangsaan Sri Wangi
 Sekolah Kebangsaan Sri Permai (JHEOA)
 Sekolah Kebangsaan Sri Chiku (2)
 Sekolah Kebangsaan Sri Chiku
 Sekolah Kebangsaan Renok Baru
 Sekolah Kebangsaan Pulat
 Sekolah Kebangsaan Pos Brooke
 Sekolah Kebangsaan Perasu
 Sekolah Kebangsaan Pasir Tumbuh
 Sekolah Kebangsaan Pasir Linggi
 Sekolah Kebangsaan Paloh Tiga
 Sekolah Kebangsaan Paloh 1 & 2
 Sekolah Kebangsaan Meranto
 Sekolah Kebangsaan Limau Kasturi 2
 Sekolah Kebangsaan Limau Kasturi 1
 Sekolah Kebangsaan Lepan JayaSK Kuala Sungai
 Sekolah Kebangsaan Kuala Lah
 Sekolah Kebangsaan Kuala Betis
 Sekolah Kebangsaan Jerek
 Sekolah Kebangsaan Jeram Tekoh
 Sekolah Kebangsaan Hendrop
 Sekolah Kebangsaan Gua Musang
 Sekolah Kebangsaan Ciku Tiga
 Sekolah Kebangsaan Chiku 7
 Sekolah Kebangsaan Blau
 Sekolah Kebangsaan Bihai
 Sekolah Kebangsaan Bertam
 Sekolah Kebangsaan Balar
 Sekolah Kebangsaan Aring
 Sekolah Jenis Kebangsaan (Cina) Gua Musang

Secondary School in Gua Musang District

 Sekolah Menengah Kebangsaan Tengku Indra Petra 1
 Sekolah Menengah Kebangsaan Tengku Indra Petra 2
 Sekolah Menengah Kebangsaan Sungai Asap
 Sekolah Menengah Kebangsaan Paloh
 Sekolah Menengah Kebangsaan Tengku Bendaraha
 Sekolah Menengah Kebangsaan Chiku 2
 Sekolah Menengah Kebangsaan Bandar Chiku
 Sekolah Menengah Sains Gua Musang

Shopping
Pasaraya Econjaya Gua Musang
Tunas Manja Supermarket, Bandar Utama
Pasaraya KU
Pasaraya Sakan
Gedung Ten Ten
Pasaraya Ra
Econsave Hypermarket (Opening soon)
TF Value-Mart Taman Saujana Harmoni (Under construction)
Lotus's (Under construction)

References

External links